Phyllonorycter maculata is a moth of the family Gracillariidae. It is known from the islands of Hokkaidō and Honshū in Japan.

The wingspan is about 5.5 mm.

The larvae feed on Alnus hirsuta and Alnus matsumurae. They mine the leaves of their host plant. The mine has the form of a ptychonomous leaf mine, occurring upon the lower surface of leaves.

References

maculata
Moths of Japan
Moths described in 1963